Ernest James Broome (July 28, 1908 – January 23, 1975) was a Canadian Progressive Conservative politician, who represented Vancouver South in the House of Commons of Canada.

References
 
  British Columbia Archives

1908 births
1975 deaths
Members of the House of Commons of Canada from British Columbia
Politicians from Vancouver
Progressive Conservative Party of Canada MPs